Hnahthial is the headquarters of Hnahthial district in the Indian state of Mizoram. The term Hnahthial is a Mizo term which means Phrynium capitatum, a plant which grows in plenty in Hnahthial.

Demographics
As of the 2011 Census of India, Hnahthial has a population of 7187 of which 3,573 are males while 3,614 are females as per report released by Census India 2011. Hnahthial has an average literacy rate of 97.24%, higher than state average of 91.33%: male literacy is 97.94%, and female literacy is 96.55%. In Hnahthial, 13.18% of the population is under 6 years of age.

Education 

There is one college, Hnahthial College, under Mizoram University and a number of public and private schools. Hnahthial has one government higher secondary school, two government high schools, three middle schools, seven government primary schools and seven private schools.

The high schools run by the government of Mizoram are Government High School and Southern High School; middle schools run by the government of Mizoram are the Indira Memorial Middle School, Model Middle School and Government Middle School

Primary schools run by the government of Mizoram are named Primary School 1 through 7.

Elementary education is being administered by sub-divisional education officer.

The private schools are Nuchhungi English Medium School that won the first prize in Middle School section march past competition in 2020 in the first Republic Day celebration held in Hnahthial after Hnahthial District was made functional, Mantawni Memorial English School, English Congregation School, which was awarded best model in the State level Inspire Award Science exhibition in 2016 and was entitled to National Level Science Exhibition, Delhi. Sapzari Memorial School, Moriah Public School and St. Stephen's School.

Transport
A helicopter service by Pawan Hans has been started which connects the Aizawl  with Hnahthial. The distance between Hnahthial and Aizawl through NH 54 is 172 km and is connected by a bus and jeep/maxi cab service.

Neighbourhoods
 Peniel Veng
 Model Veng (formerly Aithur Veng)
 Chanmari Veng (formerly Chawngtui Veng)
 Lungleng Veng
 Venglai (formerly Tarpho Veng)
 Bazar Veng
 Kanaan Veng
 Electric Veng

Media
The major newspapers in Hnahthial are Huihchhuk, Rallang Weekly, Hnahthial Today, Hnahthial Times and Calathea.

There are two cable television networks - LD Cable Network and VL Vision.

Notable residents

Notable former residents of Hnahthial include:
 Jeje Lalpekhlua – Indian footballer. Has played more than fifty games for the India national team.

References

Cities and towns in Lunglei district